Qiyas Tests belong to the ETEC (education & Training Evaluation Commission)

ETEC stated that 334,515 students performed the test either remotely or at computerized sites in both science and theoretical tracks with a statistic as the following:

Total of male testees: 147.869 Remotely: 91.774 Computerized sites: 56.095 Total of female testees: 186.646 Remotely: 125.851

Computerized sites: 60.795

Moreover, ETEC mentioned that the percentage of distinguished students in SAAT for this year amounted to 6.4% assuring that those testees with a distinguished performance in GAT and SAAT shall receive the Excellence Award at ETEC’s International Conference.

Furthermore, ETEC clarified that SAAT auditing process went through several stages starting from AI report for sensitive readings of normal and abnormal clicks and then human review to ensure the quality and level of sensitivity. After that, checking for violations by auditors and supervisors, and finally reviewing the examination committee and taking the appropriate decision according to the test Regulations, stating that the violations that require canceling the test include using the mobile phone for the purpose of cheating by calling, taking pictures or any other prohibited action due to the test regulations.

In addition, ETEC stated that the percentage of violations requiring cancellation of the test was 0.7% of the total number of testees while the percentage of those who had technical issues that required additional verification was 0.35%, the percentage of those who required completing verification of their identities was 1.9%, and the percentage of violations requiring additional review was 1.4%.

It is worth mentioning that ETEC has achieved a great success in conducting remote SAAT which attracted a number of countries to benefit from this experience which was reviewed by the World Bank in a specialized symposium. Such success was achieved in cooperation with various government entities in where  ETEC was able to provide the platform in a record time following the highest and most precise international standards.

ETEC invites everyone to make use of its full range of support services via the following channels:

ETEC application, available to download from both Apple Store and Google Store

Call Center: 920033555

Contact Us form via the ETEC website

Twitter: @Eteccare

Qiyas Tests 
 Test general aptitude
 Test general aptitude for academics
 Test general aptitude in English
 Test grades science faculties - students
 Achievement test theory for colleges - students
 Acceptance of scientific disciplines - Students test
 Acceptance of theoretical disciplines - Students test
 Test skills in English
 Arabic language test for non-children

Test goals
It is a test that measures the student's ability of analytical and logical reasoning, mainly testing the following:

 The ability to reading comprehension.
 The ability to recognize logical relationships.
 The ability to resolve issues based on the basic mathematical concepts.
 The ability to make conclusions .
 The ability  to critically think .

Further information about the test
It includes test Bdzoah (verbal and quantitative) a number of experimental questions, but they do not count toward degree obtained by the student.
Questions provided alternately between the verbal and quantitative part in five sections, each of which is allocated 25 minutes.
A fixed number of questions in all the tests over the years, as well as divisions allocated to each department and time. The same questions vary from test to another and remains that there is a uniform level of difficulty of maintaining it between these tests. The center is to balance the results of each test with the results of previous tests by monitoring results; with the aim of standardization and consistency of the test.
Arrange the questions, according to difficulty, from easiest to hardest in each section of the six test sections. The student must answer questions quickly included him answer all the questions in time for each section (25 minutes).

Duration of the test
The test is done in 2 hours. It is divided into four sections alternating between verbal and quantitative, 25 minutes for each section.

The result
After the test was held, the center correct answer sheets, using the patch Alala.otrsd results, and prints, and declare after Thalilha.obamkan student to know the outcome by the unified phone or the Center's website, and the results are sent mobile messages to those who register to this service in the registry of the test process. Note that the center provides university and college students are the results of Aketrona.oama a student has resulted in the test more than once; send top class obtained.

There is no pass or fail the test, but to monitor the degree to which the student obtained; based on correct answers serve as a measure of the level and location of the student among his peers who took the exam. Each institution of higher education institutions adopt a certain weight to high school grades, a certain ranging and significant degrees of this test; and then be competition for admission in that the (university or college) based on the degree earned after applying my weight Class, and the weight of student achievement test score (if was required).

Universities and colleges that require aptitude test
 All Saudi universities
 King Faisal university
 Bahrain University
 Sultan Qaboos university
 All military academies
 Health colleges affiliated to the Ministry of Health
 King Saud bin Abdulaziz University for Health Sciences of the National Guard
 Prince Sultan Private University
 Teachers Colleges
 Some of the technical colleges of the General Organization for Technical Education and Vocational Training
 School of Communication and Information in Riyadh
 Faculty of Medicine, King Fahd Medical City
 Yamamah Community College
 Riyadh Dental and Pharmacy Faculty
 Community College of Science Baha
 Jubail Industrial College
 The Ministry of Higher Education missions
 Technical Studies Institute of the Air Force
 Technical Training Institute Civil Aviation Authority
 Training of the Saudi Electricity Company institutes
 Saudi Institute for Japanese cars
 Training and scholarship programs Aramco (requiring more than 80 degrees)
 Training and scholarship programs SABIC (requiring more than 75 degrees)

Success and failure in the test
There is no pass or fail at this exam, but the student gets a certain degree (maximum 100 degrees) [3] have a certain weight when the body that leads to it. And should not be compared to the degree of aptitude test by high school, what is important is the student site among the students who entered the test; according to the following:

Related links
 The official site of the National Center for Measurement and Evaluation 
 The Ministry of Higher Education site 

Language tests
Standardized tests in Saudi Arabia